Nikolai Parfionov; born May 25, 1976) is a Russian nordic combined athlete who competed from 1998 to 2002. He won a bronze medal in the 4 x 5 km team event at the 1999 FIS Nordic World Ski Championships in Ramsau and finished 25th in the 7.5 km sprint event at those same championships.

Parfionov's best individual career finish was 16th in the 7.5 km sprint event in Norway in 2001.

External links

Russian male Nordic combined skiers
1976 births
Living people
FIS Nordic World Ski Championships medalists in Nordic combined